Idris bin Idris known as Idris II (August 791 – August 828), was the son of Idris I, the founder of the Idrisid dynasty in Morocco. He was born in Walīlī two months after the death of his father. He succeeded his father Idris I in 803.

Biography
Idris II was born on August 791, two months after the death—June 791—of Idris I. His mother was Kenza, his father's wife and the daughter of the Awraba tribe chieftain, Ishaq ibn Mohammed al-Awarbi. He was raised among the Berber Awraba tribe of Volubilis. In 803, he was proclaimed Imam in the mosque of Walila succeeding his father.

Of the Idrisid sultans Idris II was one of the best educated. In the work of Ibn al-Abbar, correspondence between Idris II and his contemporary Ibrahim I ibn al-Aghlab is quoted in which he invites him to renounce his claims to his territories.

By the end of Idris II's reign, the Idrisid kingdom included the area between the Shalif river in modern-day Algeria and the Sus in southern Morocco.

Idris II died in Volubilis in 828. His grave is contained in the Zawiyya Moulay Idris in Fez. It was rediscovered under the Marinid Sultan Abd al-Haqq II (1420–1465) in 1437, and became an important place of pilgrimage in the 15th century. It is, up till the present, considered the holiest place of Fez.

Genealogy

References

791 births
828 deaths
9th-century Arabs
Idrisid emirs
People from Fez, Morocco
Moroccan Shia Muslims
Medieval child monarchs
9th-century monarchs in Africa
9th-century Moroccan people
People from Volubilis
City founders
Slave owners